The International Collegiate Hockey Association (ICHA) was an intercollegiate ice hockey conference from 1965-80 competing in the National Association of Intercollegiate Athletics (NAIA). The conference had member schools in both Canada and the United States.

History 
The league was founded in 1965 with member schools Bemidji State University, Lake Superior State University, Lakehead University, St. Cloud State University, and University of Wisconsin-Superior.

St. Cloud State dropped out of the league after four seasons in April 1969 due to lack of an indoor facility.

In 1972-73, Lake Superior State played in both the ICHA and Central Collegiate Hockey Association (CCHA). In 1973, LSSU left the ICHA for the CCHA. The following season, the Lakers left the NAIA to become an NCAA Division I ice hockey program.

LSSU was replaced by the College of St. Scholastica starting in the 1972-73 season.

Lakehead left the ICHA after the 1976-77 season.

Decline and Disbandment 
Following the departure of Lakehead, the ICHA made an attempt to add former member St. Cloud State plus Mankato State, Wisconsin-River Falls, and Wisconsin-Stout. Another proposal of the ICHA was to join the Minnesota Intercollegiate Athletic Conference for hockey only, which would have brought that league's hockey membership to 10 teams. Neither plan came to fruition.

St. Scholastica left the conference following the 1977-78 season leaving the ICHA with just two members.

On June 1, 1980, Bemidji State and Wisconsin-Superior joined Mankato State University, St. Cloud State University, Wisconsin-Eau Claire, and Wisconsin-River Falls to form the Northern Collegiate Hockey Association.

Conference Champions 

1967 Bemidji State/Lakehead University
1968 Lake Superior State
1969 Bemidji State
1970 Bemidji State/Lake Superior State
1971 Bemidji State
1972 Lake Superior State
1973 Bemidji State/Lake Superior State
1974 Bemidji State
1975 St. Scholastica
1976 Bemidji State
1977 Bemidji State
1978 Bemidji State
1979 Bemidji State
1980 Bemidji State

National Championships 
The ICHA dominated the NAIA ice hockey tournament winning 12 of 13 national titles from 1968-80. All 13 championship games featured at least one ICHA team. Seven championships were an inter-conference match-up.

NAIA National Champions

References

College ice hockey conferences in the United States
Defunct NCAA Division I ice hockey conferences